Hrudayavantha is a 2003 Indian Kannada-language drama film directed and written by P. Vasu and produced by K. Manju. The film stars Vishnuvardhan, Nagma and Anu Prabhakar. The film met with average reviews upon release. The soundtrack and score was composed by Hamsalekha.

Cast 

 Vishnuvardhan as Shivaswamy
 Nagma
 Anu Prabhakar as Goutami 
 Srinath
 Doddanna
 Shobharaj
 Renuka Prasad
 Pragathi
 Shivaram
 Rangayana Raghu
 Ramesh Bhat
 Mandya Ramesh

Soundtrack 

Hamsalekha composed the film's background score and music for its soundtrack, also writing its lyrics. The soundtrack album consists of six tracks.

References

External links 
 Review
 Viggy

2003 films
2000s Kannada-language films
Indian drama films
Films scored by Hamsalekha
Films directed by P. Vasu